Malte Myrenberg Gårdinger (born 23 July 2000) is a Swedish actor. In 2021, he starred as August in the Netflix series Young Royals. He is the son of the Swedish television personality Pontus Gårdinger.

Since 2021, Gårdinger releases music under the name Gibbon (stylised in all caps).

Filmography

Film

Television

Discography

References

External links
 
 

2000 births
21st-century Swedish male actors
Living people
Male actors from Stockholm
Swedish male film actors
Swedish male television actors
Place of birth missing (living people)